Breaux is a surname. Notable people with the surname include:
Aminta H. Breaux (born 1959), American psychologist and academic administrator
Brandon Breaux, visual artist from Chicago
D-D Breaux, coach of the Louisiana State University's women's gymnastics team
Delvin Breaux (born 1989), American football player
Don Breaux, American football player and coach
Jean Breaux, American politician serving in the Indiana state Senate
John Breaux, American politician, former U.S. Senator and U.S. Representative from Louisiana
Marc Breaux (1924–2013), American choreographer 
Tim Breaux, American basketball player
Frank Ocean, singer/songwriter, born Christopher Edwin Breaux

See also
Breaux Greer, American javelin thrower
Breaux Bridge, Louisiana